Noland Bay is a bay in Northern Tasmania, Australia located in Bass Strait. The bay is situated on the mouth of the Pipers River. There are two towns located on the bay: Weymouth and Bellingham.

Northern Tasmania
Bays of Tasmania